Rindom is a surname.  Notable people with the surname include:

 Anne-Marie Rindom (born 1991), Danish sailor
 Christina Rindom (born 1973), Danish rower
 Jessie Rindom (1903–1981), Danish film actress
 Svend Rindom (1884–1960), Danish screenwriter and film actor